David Reynolds (born 3 July 1985) is an Australian professional racing driver. He currently drives in the Repco Supercars Championship for Grove Racing, racing the No. 26 Ford Mustang. He won the 2017 Supercheap Auto Bathurst 1000 with co-driver Luke Youlden.

In 2021, he formed cartopia.com.au with fellow Supercars driver Will Brown.

Early career
Reynolds stepped into a national series campaign in the 2003 Australian Formula Ford Championship, finishing outside the top ten at series end. For 2004 Reynolds joined the Sonic Motor Racing Services for what would be four years and bring two national championships. First came victory in the 2004 Australian Formula Ford Championship. Moving away from open wheelers, Reynolds became part of Team Sonic expansion into Carrera Cup Australia. Finishing fifth in his first season, Reynolds stepped into third as the series transitioned from the Porsche 996 to the Porsche 997 in the 2006 season. After a season-long battle with Alex Davison and Craig Baird, Reynolds claimed the 2007 title.

Supercars Championship

Endurance co-driver (2007–08)
Reynolds' 2007 form in Carrera Cup made him a natural fit for an endurance race co-driver role and he was signed to drive with the HSV Dealer Team until Paul Radisich became available after he left Team Kiwi Racing. He moved into a co-driver role with Cameron McConville at Paul Weel Racing but the team failed to finish the Sandown 500, and failed to start the Bathurst as the engine failed on the warm-up lap.

With Team Sonic not yet ready to step into the Fujitsu V8 Supercar Series, Reynolds joined 2007 Fujitsu Series Champions Tony D'Alberto Racing, finishing his first season in the category fourth in the standings. Unfortunately, Reynolds' results from the 2008 V8 Supercars endurance events resembled those from the year prior. Paired with Paul Dumbrell, they failed to finish the Phillip Island 500. This preceded a Bathurst 1000 on the sidelines after Reynolds gave up his seat in Dumbrell's car for Rick Kelly, after Kelly's car was unable to be repaired for the race from Radisich's career-ending crash in practice.

Walkinshaw Racing (2009)
In 2009, Reynolds drove for Walkinshaw Racing in the #24 Bundaberg Red Racing Holden VE Commodore, partnering Paul Dumbrell in the Autobarn Commodore as part of a new four-car squad. He displayed promise throughout the season, but was generally struck with bad luck. A standout performance for the year occurred at Barbagallo Raceway, where Reynolds ran in the top three cars for most of the race. The likely podium result came unstuck when a delaminated front left tyre put him in the sand trap at turn 6, and he eventually finished in 22nd place. In the final standings, Reynolds placed in 22nd for the year, without a contract for the 2010 season.

Endurance return (2010)
For 2010, Reynolds was retained by Walkinshaw Racing for the endurance events, joining Will Davison in the #22 Toll HRT Holden VE Commodore at Phillip Island and Bathurst. The pairing had a strong showing at the Bathurst 1000, with the car being in the top five cars for most of the day. However, while running in third with only a handful of laps remaining, Davison had a race-ending crash at the top of the mountain. For the Gold Coast 600, Reynolds joined Fabian Coulthard in the #24 Bundaberg Red Racing Holden, in order for the four-car Walkinshaw team to abide by the international co-driver regulations at the time.

Kelly Racing (2011)

For the 2011 season, Reynolds joined Kelly Racing to drive the #16 Stratco Holden VE Commodore, with Greg Murphy as his teammate. Despite racing in the oldest car in the field at the time, he achieved a credible 19th placing in the championship. The season was highlighted by a couple top 5 finishes as well as multiple shootout appearances, including at Bathurst. From midway through the 2011 season, tensions began showing between the team and Reynolds and his engineer James Small. This came to a head when at Phillip Island, remarks over team radio from Small aimed towards Rick Kelly caused Small to be let go from the team. Reynolds stated that he was unsure if he would race at Bathurst that year, much less the rest of the season. Reynolds would go on to finish the season with Kelly Racing, but was released from his contract after only one year of his two-year deal at the team to pursue other opportunities.

Rod Nash Racing (2012–15)

2012

After widely reported rumours of the move, for the 2012 season Reynolds switched teams and manufacturers to join Rod Nash Racing to drive the #55 Bottle-O Ford FG Falcon prepared by Ford Performance Racing. He was rejoined by James Small, his engineer from the previous season. Reynolds' 2012 season was a notable step up from years past, with consistent top ten qualifying positions and race results recorded throughout the year. Despite consistently performing at his new team, accidents, mechanical failures, and bad luck marred the season, with multiple promising race results being compromised. Reynolds scored his first pole position at Townsville after numerous front-row starts, eventually finishing 6th. Reynolds paired with Dean Canto for the year's endurance races, and started from the front row start at the Sandown 500, eventually finishing in 6th place. For the 2012 Bathurst 1000, the 50th running of the event, the Rod Nash Racing car paid homage to the 1967 Bathurst winning car of Fred Gibson and Harry Firth, with a livery closely resembling the winning car, a 1967 Ford Falcon GT. The team also changed the car number to 52 for the race. Reynolds participated in the shootout and qualified the car 8th, and had a hard-fought battle with eventual victor Jamie Whincup in the dying stages. He eventually crossing the line second, only 0.786 seconds behind Whincup, the record for shortest winning margin at the time. In his characteristic funny-man style, while the winning drivers Whincup and Dumbrell threw their racing boots off the podium into the crowd, Reynolds threw the microphone of then broadcaster of Channel 7 into the sea of fans below. Reynolds 2012 championship position was 9th place.

2013
For 2013, Reynolds continued in the #55, however, engineer James Small was switched to the #5 Pepsi Max car of Mark Winterbottom, with Nathaniel Osborne joining Reynolds. Reynolds' season started poorly, placing no higher than 14th in the first two rounds as well as a crash in Tasmania. Results improved as the season progressed, with Reynolds consistently recording top-ten qualifying and race results. At Hidden Valley, Reynolds scored two pole positions and had strong car pace. He finished on the podium in the final race of the event. For the endurance races, Reynolds was again joined by Dean Canto. For the 2013 Bathurst 1000, Reynolds qualified the car in 9th, and for most of the race the car was in the top ten. In the final laps of the race, Reynolds had just passed Bright for 5th position when he was told that the car didn't have enough fuel to make it to the end. A pit stop two laps from the finish relegated him to 9th place. The regulations for co-drivers at the Gold Coast 600 were changed in 2013, with Reynolds retaining Canto for the event. Reynolds qualified on pole for the second race of the weekend, his first pole position in a shootout. After a strong race, Reynolds was in second place behind James Courtney in the #22 Toll HRT Holden VF Commodore with 20 laps to go. After a front suspension failure for #22 car, Reynolds inherited the lead of the race which maintained until the chequered flag to take his maiden V8 Supercars victory. In his characteristic irreverent style, he threw pot plants off the podium to his team, and as the podium presentation was being undertaken hit the Armor-All Man with his own foam hammer, as well as co-driver Canto. In the final two events of the season, Reynolds experienced incredibly good luck. In the first race at Phillip Island, he was hit by an out-of-control Alex Premat at turn 4, but was only spun, suffering minimal damage at the rear of his car, while the car of James Courtney one place behind him took the full impact of Premat's car. Courtney was unable to race for the rest of the season as a result of his injuries. The luck continued as early in the first race of the season's final event in Sydney, Reynolds' car was vaulted up on two wheels after a bottleneck of cars on the tight circuit, caused by Mark Winterbottom spinning Craig Lowndes at turn 10. This amazingly resulted in no damage to the suspension or steering, but Reynolds continued on and finished 11th. In the final race of the season, Reynolds qualified in an uncharacteristic 17th place. However, through clever pit strategy and staying out of trouble at the treacherous circuit, Reynolds brought the car home in 4th position. Reynolds eventually finished the season in 9th place.

2014

For the 2014 season, Reynolds had his third season in the #55 Rod Nash Racing Bottle-O Ford. Reynolds season again started with mixed results, following a trend of poor results in the two short 'sprint' races on the Saturday, but top ten results in the longer races on Sunday. Results improved after the Tasmanian event, where consistently finished inside the top 15 cars, but suffered numerous retirements throughout the season. For the endurance races, Reynolds was again joined by Dean Canto. At the Sandown 500, the pairing recorded a 9th-place finish. The car was likely going to finish on the podium before Reynolds was given a drive-through penalty for a pit stop infringement.  The 2014 Bathurst 1000 looked promising from the outset for Reynolds and Canto, as the #55 was in the top three in all practice sessions, breaking the lap record in the final Thursday practice. Unfortunately, in the qualifying session Reynolds had a large crash at the top of the mountain, a result of going slightly wide of the racing line when going around the outside of a slower car. An exclusion from the session for teammate Chaz Mostert, as well as the #2 HRT Commodore not taking part in the race from damage meant that Reynolds and Canto started the race from 24th position. Consistent safety cars during the race and car pace that was equal to the lead group left them well inside the top ten by the middle of the race. At the red flag period on lap 61 for track repair, the #55 was in second position. The car continued in the top three cars until its retirement on lap 118, where during a safety car period and running in second place, an alternator failure forced the car to retire. Continuing the run of poor luck, at the final endurance event at Surfers Paradise, when running in the top five cars, Reynolds clipped a tyre bundle in the Beach Chicane. He drove on for two more corners before the right front suspension failed and Reynolds crashed the car heavily into a concrete wall. The car was repaired in time for the race the next day where he and Canto finished a respectable 6th. At the final round in Sydney, Reynolds recorded his first podium finish of the season with a third placing in the first race. Reynolds eventually finished the season in 15th position.

2015

For the 2015 season, Reynolds had his final year in the #55 Rod Nash Racing Bottle-O Ford Falcon, and his most successful season to date. During the offseason, Ford Performance Racing were renamed Prodrive Racing Australia after Ford Australia chose to not renew their factory support for the team. Despite this, the team introduced the new FGX Falcon that would initially be driven by Pepsi Max drivers Mark Winterbottom and Chaz Mostert, while the other two cars of Reynolds and Andre Heimgartner would be upgraded later in the season. Brad Wischusen was placed into the lead engineering role for the #55, with Nathaniel Osborne moving into a different position within the team. Reynolds recorded poor results in the first round in Adelaide while still running the older model FG Falcon, the one likely top ten result being undone by being spun by Michael Caruso at turn 9. At the next round in Tasmania, Reynolds received the updated FGX Falcon, and the new car brought with it an instant improvement in results. He qualified in the top 5 for all three races, and finished the two Saturday races in 6th and 4th respectively. For the Sunday race, Reynolds started on the front row alongside Craig Lowndes. Reynolds made the better start of the two cars, but Lowndes spun the #55 at the second corner, with Reynolds eventually finishing 11th. From this point forward in the season, Reynolds consistently recorded top ten qualifying and race positions. For the Sunday race at Hidden Valley, Reynolds qualified on pole. Reynolds took his second career victory and first solo victory in V8 Supercars racing after capitalising on a mistake from early leader Fabian Coulthard, and avoiding a penalty from running straight ahead at turn 5 while avoiding a lapped car. After the podium presentation, Reynolds performed a 'shoey' on the podium, drinking champagne from his race boot, a move subsequently made world famous by Australian Formula 1 driver Daniel Ricciardo. Reynolds continued the good qualifying and race results throughout the rest of the season, finishing outside the top ten cars on only one occasion until the end of the season, highlighted by dual podium finishes in Townsville, taking pole position at Bathurst, a podium finish on the Gold Coast, a podium finish and a race win at Pukekohe, and a podium finish at the final event in Sydney. The only non-top ten finish was as a result of Shane van Gisbergen in the first race at Phillip Island, in which he spun Reynolds at the fast Hayshed turn while only a few inches up the side of the #55. The car escaped damage from its high-speed spin, but the incident resulted in a 25th-place finish. Reynolds final championship position for the season was an excellent third place. Despite the competitive results and high championship placing, Reynolds was not retained by Prodrive Racing Australia for the 2016 season, and announced in November 2015 that he would leave the team to drive for Erebus Motorsport for the 2016 season.

Erebus Motorsport (2016–2020)

2016

For the 2016 season, Reynolds was signed to drive the #9 Erebus Motorsport Holden VF Commodore with title sponsorship from Penrite Oil Company. In the 2015–16 offseason, Erebus Motorsport went through a significant overhaul. The team elected to cease their Mercedes E63 AMG program, and instead purchased two older model Walkinshaw Racing Holden Commodores that they would prepare with their own in-house designed and fabricated componentry. The team also relocated from Queensland to Melbourne, Victoria, and had to build up a near entirely new group of staff, including new mechanics and engineers. As a result, the team, and Reynolds, struggled at the beginning of the season. The team were inexperienced, and the dated Walkinshaw Racing Holdens were not up to the technical specifications of the front-running cars. The early part of the season was highlighted by a top 5 finish in the wet Sunday race at Adelaide, where through good car pace, careful driving in the treacherous conditions, and a clever strategy from the team with a time-certain race finish and required fuel drop, propelled the #9 car to the front of the field. Despite the development of the team and the car, Reynolds mostly ran around the middle to the back of the field for the duration of the season. Highlights included an admirable 6th-place finish in the Sunday race at Winton from a lowly 17th place qualifying position, through nothing other than a fast car (shown by Reynolds recording the fastest lap of the race), as well as recording the fastest race lap time at Bathurst, and shootout appearances in Townsville, the Gold Coast and Sydney. Good race results at Townsville and the Gold Coast were street circuits were undone by either incorrect strategy calls or the #9 being involved in incidents during the races. For the endurance races, Reynolds was partnered with Craig Baird, although the pairing failed to garner notable results. From Bathurst onwards, former Walkinshaw Racing engineer Alistair McVean joined the team as lead engineer on the #9 car. The best event result for Reynolds came at the season's final event in Sydney, also being the final event held at the circuit. Reynolds qualified in 7th position for the Saturday race, but was excluded from qualifying because of a regulatory violation in parc fermé after the session. Despite starting in last place, he brought the #9 Penrite car home in 10th place. The highlight of the entire season for the team came in the last race of the season the next day, with Reynolds making the shootout and qualifying in 4th. Reynolds made his way up to third place during the race, and endured a long battle with Jamie Whincup in the closing stages for the final podium spot. He crossed the line in third for Reynolds' and Erebus Motorsport's first podium of the season. Reynolds finished the season in 16th place in the championship.

2017

For 2017 Reynolds remained at Erebus Motorsport, with the car retaining the backing of Penrite for the #9 Commodore. In the 2016–17 off-season, the team embarked on building a new car for Reynolds from the ground up, built to Reynolds' and Erebus Motorsport's specifications, as opposed to the Walkinshaw Racing car that they were working with previously. However, the team elected to continue using the well-rounded Walkinshaw Racing engine package. Reynolds endured a lacklustre opening round in Adelaide. Despite featuring in the shootout for the Saturday race, he didn't have a car to challenge for the top positions, and this was compounded with receiving a drive-through penalty for exceeding track limits too many times, resulting in an 18th-place finish. Another finish outside of the top ten followed on Sunday. However, from Tasmania onwards, results improved, with Reynolds and Erebus Motorsport consistently being in and around the top ten cars in qualifying and races. The combination of Reynolds, engineer Alistair McVean, and a brand new car with quality componentry developed by Erebus entailed strong results in nearly every session that the team participated in, albeit with the car regularly struggling with pace over longer stints in races. Highlights included a podium finish at Phillip Island, another stirring drive at Winton with a 4th-place result after a 14th place qualifying position, as well as top five qualifying positions at Hidden Valley and Townsville. For the endurance races, Reynolds was partnered with Luke Youlden. At the first endurance event at Sandown, stated as being a retro round, the #9 Penrite Holden ran a tribute livery to the Holden Torana L34 ran in 1976 by Peter Brock and Phil Brock. The event started well for Reynolds and Youlden, with Youlden winning the first co-driver qualifying race, and Reynolds finishing the second qualifying race in third. After starting from third, the car suffered from a tyre delamination mid-way through the race and eventually finished in 17th. At the 2017 Bathurst 1000, the #9 car was consistently among the top few cars in the free practice sessions, and Reynolds qualified the car in second for the shootout. In the shootout, Reynolds consolidated the speed shown from the car and recorded a lap time quick enough for second place on the grid. Despite the weekend having been run in dry conditions up to that point, nearly the entirety of the race was run in wet conditions. Reynolds and Youlden kept themselves in contention for victory throughout the day, making minimal mistakes and keeping themselves within the top three cars for the duration of the race. Late race safety cars and fuel strategy complicated the complexion of the race in the dying stages. At a late-race restart, Reynolds was positioned just inside the top ten, fuel strategy having taken the #9 out of the top few cars. Another restart soon after with subsequent strategy plays from other teams left Reynolds in fourth position, but a light sprinkling of rain on the pit straight caused the two leading cars of Shane van Gisbergen and Garth Tander to run off at the final corner, leaving Reynolds in second position behind Nick Percat. Reynolds had superior car speed over Percat, and quickly passed him, but had to conserve fuel in order to make it to the end. Subsequent safety car periods eased the need to conserve fuel, and Reynolds was able to guide the #9 Erebus Penrite Commodore to victory on a treacherous drying track, setting the fastest lap time of the day in the final laps of the race. It was the maiden Bathurst victory for Reynolds, Youlden, and Erebus Motorsport, and the first independent Australian team to win the Bathurst 1000 since Garth Tander and Jason Bargwanna won the 2000 Bathurst 1000 for Garry Rogers Motorsport in similar conditions. The remaining endurance event at the Gold Coast didn't yield similar results, with damage on the car hindering the driver change and subsequent race result in the first race, and a mistake and resulting crash by Youlden taking the pairing out of a top ten position in the Sunday race. Reynolds ended the year with a third-place finishing in the Sunday race of the inaugural Newcastle 500, finishing 7th in the championship.

2018
Continuing with Erebus Motorsport in the Penrite #9, the team and category welcomed in the new ZB Holden Commodore to replace the aging VF model. The team elected to build another new car for Reynolds, with new teammate Anton De Pasquale inheriting Reynolds' 2017 car. The new Holden instantly proved to be competitive, with Reynolds claiming multiple top five placings in the first few rounds of the season, including podium placings at Adelaide, Phillip Island, Barbagallo, and Hidden Valley, with race wins at Albert Park and Hidden Valley, with the latter coming after an incredible pass around the outside from fourth place at the first turn on the first lap of the race. Reynolds consistently placed in the top ten for the majority of races during the year, occasionally finishing down the order from poor tyre life, incidents, or failures during qualifying or the race. Reynolds was again joined by Luke Youlden for the endurance races, and the competitiveness of the car stepped up for these events. Youlden and Reynolds took pole position for the Sandown 500, finishing in fifth, and for the Bathurst 1000, with teammate De Pasquale qualifying in third. The 2018 Bathurst 1000 was largely dominated by the #9 Penrite car of Reynolds and Youlden, with there seemingly being no challenger to the pace of the car for the best part of the race. The race was uncharacteristically devoid of safety cars and drama, with it being very much a lights-to-flag sprint for the duration. Despite the formidable car performance and Reynolds' ability at the circuit, he would succumb to fatigue in the late stages of the race, conceding the lead to the #888 of Lowndes and Steven Richards. Reynolds would later pit and let Youlden bring the car home, with Reynolds giving an emotional interview to pit reporter and multiple Bathurst winner Greg Murphy after getting out of the car. The car would eventually finish in 13th place, having also recorded the fastest lap of the race for three years in succession. The #9 car wouldn't finish outside of the top five cars for the rest of the season, claiming another shootout pole position at Surfers Paradise, and a second placing and a victory from pole position at the final event in Newcastle. Reynolds would finish the season in fifth place in the championship.

2019
Entering his fourth season with Erebus in the #9 Penrite car, Reynolds was touted as the potential 2019 championship winner by multiple-times champion and Bathurst winner Craig Lowndes. As an additional coup for Erebus Motorsport and their continued form in the Supercars Championship, Penrite extended their sponsorship over the two cars in the team, after holding the naming rights to Anton De Pasquale's car for the final few events of the 2018 season. Reynolds' season started out slower than the year previous, recording top ten results in all seven opening races before scoring a place on the podium with third place on Sunday in Tasmania. 

The consistent results would continue with top ten placinging in all races aside from an 11th place on the Sunday at Phillip Island. The hopes of Reynolds, or any other driver in fact, at fighting for the 2019 Championship were dashed at the dominating fashion in which Scott McLaughlin and DJR Team Penske started the 2019 season, with McLaughlin winning nearly every race. At Winton, the form of the Erebus Commodores strengthened, with Reynolds and teammate De Pasquale often being some of the best placed Holdens in the field in qualifying and races, the cars consistently fighting with and beating powerhouse factory-backed team Triple Eight Race Engineering. Reynolds position in the top three cars in the championship standings was solidified by two podium placings in Hidden Valley, beaten only by Ford Mustangs.

2020
Reynolds began 2020 strongly with, topping first practice before qualifying second despite front suspension damage for the opening race at the Adelaide 500. Challenging eventual race winner Jamie Whincup, Reynolds came home fourth, with an engine issue in the #9 Penrite Erebus Commodore forcing him to start 14th for Race 2. A collision with Erebus teammate Anton DePasquale saw both cars fail to finish in what was to be the final race prior to COVID impacting the running of the 2020 Virgin Australia Supercars Championship. 

As teams moved to the second round at the Australian Formula One Grand Prix, the Friday morning (March 13) official cancellation of the event saw the series on hiatus until late June. 

The return event was a reformatted Sydney SuperNight, with Reynolds posting a best finish of fourth place, which the Erebus driver again repeated the next weekend at the back-to-back Sydney Motorsport Park event. Back-to-back double rounds were held at Darwin, Townsville and The Bend Motorsport Park in South Australia, with a best finish of fifth (Darwin 1 and Townsville 1). 

The opening race of the second Townsville round saw controversy with Reynolds and championship leader, Scott McLaughlin from Shell V-Power Racing, coming together at the first corner. 

Bathurst saw Reynolds co-drive with Will Brown, with Reynolds qualifying the car in 12th with a 2:04.6730. The pair came home 15th, surviving the rain and suffering with a dropped cylinder in the latter part of the race. 

Off track, Reynolds was embroiled in controversy as speculation that he wanted to end his 10-year deal with Erebus, signed in 2019. In December 2020 it was confirmed that Reynolds would depart Erebus Racing to join Kelly Racing for 2021, with Penrite Oil backing as Kelly Racing switched from Nissan Altimas to the Ford Mustang. 

Reynolds finished the 2020 season 12th in the championship on 1492 points.

Kelly Grove Racing (2021)
Kelly Racing became Kelly Grove Racing (KGR) in 2021, with Reynolds joining Andre Heimgartner at the Braeside, Victoria, team. KGR had replaced its Nissan Altima Supercars with Ford Mustangs, with minor support from Ford Australia. 

Reynolds's race number changed from #9 to #26, promoting chief sponsor Penrite Oil, which began operating in 1926. The number is also a nod to January 26th as Australia Day, with Penrite fiercely Australian.  

After Race 22, Reynolds is currently 14th in the 2021 Repco Supercars Championship on 1072 points.
Luke Youlden was announced to substitute for Reynolds after he forced out of competition for Rounds 9 and 10 due to his COVID health exemption being overturned. 

Reynolds also reunite with Luke Youlden for the 2021 Repco Bathurst 1000, whom he won the famous enduro with in 2017.

Business career
In 2021, Reynolds partnered with fellow Supercars driver Will Brown to create the Cartopia platform, with the goal to create a better car sales experience for both dealers and consumers. Launching in January 2021, Cartopia offers online vehicle search and purchasing via its website.

Reynolds is also behind road safety initiative Curb the Rage. The initiative looks to help the community overcome issues associated with road rage by increasing awareness and social issues, working in conjunction with key industry figures and with the help of corporate partners.

Career results

Career summary

Supercars Championship results
(Races in bold indicate pole position) (Races in italics indicate fastest lap)

Complete Bathurst 1000 results

‡ Rick Kelly replaced Reynolds in the #16 post-qualifying after a severe accident for Rick's original car.

References

 Crazy Dave Reynolds enlivens V8 ranks. Sydney Morning Herald, 13 October 2012
 David Reynolds Bathurst crash 2014 qualifying.Motorsport.com
 V8 Supercars Championship: Qualifying for the Wilson Security Sandown 500 live coverage. FoxSport News 2014.
 Chaz Mostert wins Bathurst 1000, pipping Jamie Whincup in final lap. ABC 2014

External References
 David Reynolds's website
 Reynolds's profile at Supercars Australia
 Reynolds's profile at Racing Reference USA
 Reynolds's profile at Driver DataBase

1985 births
Formula Ford drivers
Living people
Sportspeople from Albury
Racing drivers from New South Wales
Supercars Championship drivers
Bathurst 1000 winners
Australian Endurance Championship drivers
Kelly Racing drivers
Mercedes-AMG Motorsport drivers